Scott Davis and David Pate were the defending champions, but were defeated in the semifinals to fellow Americans Kelly Jones and Rick Leach.

Jones and Leach reached the final, but were defeated by home players The Woodies, in what was their first Grand Slam title as a pair.

Seeds

Draw

Finals

Top half

Section 1

Section 2

Bottom half

Section 3

Section 4

External links
 1992 Australian Open – Men's draws and results at the International Tennis Federation

Men's Doubles
1992